Shoe is an American comic strip about a motley crew of newspapermen, all of whom are birds. It was written and drawn by its creator, cartoonist Jeff MacNelly, from September 13, 1977 until his death in 2000. MacNelly's last strip was dated July 9, 2000; it has since been continued by Chris Cassatt, Gary Brookins, Ben Lansing, and Susie MacNelly (Jeff's widow).

While not politically oriented in the style of strips such as Doonesbury, Shoe often pokes fun at various social and political issues of the day (especially when Senator Batson D. Belfry makes an appearance). Although not particularly well known outside the U.S., Shoe was in fact granted its own monthly comic book in Norway for a brief time in 1987 under the name "Sjur," which consisted of reprints from newspapers. The magazine reached a total of six publications. Later on, in 1989, Shoe did a brief comeback to Norwegian readers, this time under the name "Krax," appearing as an extra-feature in the then brand-new Calvin & Hobbes magazine.

The strip won MacNelly the National Cartoonists Society's Reuben Award for the year 1979.

Characters and setting
Shoe deals with the day-to-day foibles of a group of newspaper employees and their families, all of whom are portrayed as anthropomorphized birds, in the fictional locale of Treetops, East Virginia.  During hunting season, "hunting dogs" (hounds with rifles, a visual pun on the sharp-sniffing canines that hunters use to track game) are occasionally featured.

Collections and reprints
(All titles by Jeff MacNelly)
 The Very First Shoe Book (1978) Avon
 The Other Shoe (1980) Avon
 Shoe Extra (1980) Yaffa Publishing (Australia)
 The New Shoe (1981) Avon
 On with the Shoe! (1982) Holt, Rinehart & Winston
 A Shoe for All Seasons (1983) HRW
 The Shoe Must Go On (1984) HRW
 The Greatest Shoe on Earth (1985) HRW
 One Shoe Fits All (1986) HRW
 How Many Next Years Do You Get in Baseball?: Shoe Goes to Wrigley Field (1988) Bonus Books
 Too Old for Summer Camp and Too Young to Retire (1988) St. Martin's Press
 A Cigar Means Never Having to Say You're Sorry (1989) St. Martin's Press
 Shake the Hand, Bite the Taco (1990) St. Martin's Press
 Apply a Little Hardware to the Software (1991) Quark Prods.
 The Athletic Shoe (1991) St. Martin's Press
 Out to Lunch: A Brand New Shoe (1993) Tribune Publishing
 New Shoes (1994) Contemporary Books
 Play Ball! All I Ever Learned I Forgot by the Third Inning (1999) Triumph
 From Couch Potato to Mouse Potato: Success Tips for the Technically Impaired (1978) Triumph
 27 Years of Shoe: World Ends at Ten, Details at Eleven (2004) Andrews McMeel

References

External links
 
 Shoe at Don Markstein's Toonopedia. Archived from the original on June 3, 2017.

American comic strips
Gag-a-day comics
Satirical comics
1977 comics debuts
Comics about birds